The 2009 African Women's Youth Handball Championship was the 2nd edition of the tournament, organized by the African Handball Confederation, under the auspices of the International Handball Federation and held in Abidjan, Ivory Coast from September 26 to 30, 2009.

Angola was the champion and the tournament qualified the top four teams to the 2010 world championship.

Participating teams

Preliminary round
The three teams played in a round robin system with the top two playing the final.

All times are local (UTC).

Final

Final standings

Awards

See also
 2010 African Women's Handball Championship
 2010 African Men's Junior Handball Championship

References

2009 in African handball
2009 African Women's Youth Handball Championship
International handball competitions hosted by Ivory Coast
Youth